Filathlitikos was a women's volleyball team from Thessaloniki in the Greek Women's Volleyball League. It won four championships, dominating the end of 1980s. It won its last championship in the 2002–3 season before going into decline. In the 2006–7 season, the team was relegated from the first division championship because of financial problems and its place was taken by Epikouros Polichnis. The decline continued and finally Filathlitikos was corporate with PAOK women's team, and later dissolved

2011–2012 squad
Anna Keramidas
Koutsonika Immortality
Mariangela Charavelouli
Kaletsiou Hero
Baldoka Evanthia
Demetra Anagnostopoulos
Argyropoulou Marina
Alexandridis Mary
Venetis Cleo
Spyros Evi
Milioni Sultana
Koutroubis Andromache
Tsantopoulou Lys
Helen Tzavara
John Veronica
Helen Baziana

Titles
National Championships (4)
1984
1986
1987
2003

References

External links

General Secretariat of Sports (Greek and English)

Greek volleyball clubs
Defunct sports teams in Greece
PAOK